James Aloysius "Ace" Lyons Jr. (September 28, 1927 – December 12, 2018) was an admiral in the United States Navy who served as Commander, U.S. Pacific Fleet from 1985 to 1987. In March 2018, Lyons caused controversy when The Washington Times published an op-ed column he wrote about the murder of Seth Rich; several inflammatory and false claims caused the paper to retract the piece entirely.

Biography 
James Lyons enlisted in the Navy Reserve shortly after World War II and was appointed to the United States Naval Academy, graduating in 1952. He earned post-graduate degrees from the Naval War College and the National Defense University.

Lyons served in the Navy for over 35 years as a Surface Warfare Officer. He earned appointments as the Commander in Chief of the U.S. Pacific Fleet, Senior U.S. Military Representative to the United Nations, and Deputy Chief of Naval Operations.

On March 1, 2018, The Washington Times published an opinion column by Lyons about Seth Rich, a Democratic Party staffer whose unsolved murder in Washington D.C. has frequently been the subject of right-wing conspiracy theories. In the column, Lyons falsely claimed it was "well known in the intelligence circles" that Rich and his brother Aaron sold a trove of non-public Democratic National Committee emails to the news leak media outlet WikiLeaks, whose publication of the confidential messages caused chaos in the Democratic Party during the 2016 United States presidential election. Aaron Rich sued and the article was retracted with an apology.

Lyons died on December 12, 2018. He was 91.

References 

1927 births
2018 deaths
People from New Jersey
Military personnel from New Jersey
United States Navy admirals
United States Naval Academy alumni
Naval War College alumni
Recipients of the Navy Distinguished Service Medal
Recipients of the Legion of Merit
Recipients of the Defense Distinguished Service Medal
Burials at the United States Naval Academy Cemetery